Toy Love was a New Zealand new wave and punk rock band that originated in Dunedin and was active from 1978 to 1980. Members included Chris Knox, Alec Bathgate and Paul Kean.

History
Chris Knox was the band's front man and other members were guitarist Alec Bathgate, bass player Paul Kean, drummer Mike Dooley, and keyboard player Jane Walker. The band developed out of the earlier punk band The Enemy from Dunedin, and are often regarded as the progenitors of the Dunedin sound movement. Toy Love were together for less than two years (1978–80) and spent a large part of that time in Australia.

They released just one album, which was self-titled Toy Love. The band members were apparently appalled by the mixing of the tracks, which took the edge off the band's deliberately raw sound. Allmusic gave the album a 3/5 rating. In April 2005, the album was remastered and released along with a number of demos and unreleased tracks as a double CD entitled Cuts. In 2012, a further compilation, simply titled Toy Love, was released on double LP, containing all singles, b-sides, compilation tracks, demos and some live recordings (this has the same front cover artwork as Cuts).

After Toy Love broke up, Bathgate and Knox remained together as the Tall Dwarfs. Kean was later a member of The Bats.

In 2012, Toy Love was inducted into the New Zealand Music Hall of Fame and given the Legacy Award at the Vodafone New Zealand Music Awards.

Jane Walker died in October 2018; her death was announced by Flying Nun Records on Twitter.

Discography

Studio albums

Live albums

Compilation albums

Extended Plays

Singles

Awards

Aotearoa Music Awards
The Aotearoa Music Awards (previously known as New Zealand Music Awards (NZMA)) are an annual awards night celebrating excellence in New Zealand music and have been presented annually since 1965.

! 
|-
| 2012 || Toy Love || New Zealand Music Hall of Fame ||  || 
|-

References

External links 
 Official Toy Love Flying Nun artist page

Musical groups established in 1978
Musical groups disestablished in 1980
Flying Nun Records artists
Dunedin Sound musical groups
New Zealand punk rock groups